The lumbar fascia is an anatomic structure of the lumbar region. It consists of a band or sheet of connective tissue fibres, primarily collagen, that attaches, stabilizes, encloses and separates muscles not limited to the lumbar region as the name suggests, but extending upwards over the thorax to the neck and downwards over the muscles covering the sacrum. The upper thoracic portion is thin while the lumbar and sacral regions are thicker and stronger.

Function

The lumbar fascia binds the deep muscles of the back to the spine and to the transverse processes of the vertebrae. Additionally the lumbar fascia is an attachment for the gluteus maximus muscle and the latissimus dorsi muscle.

Extent

The posterior layer covers the loin and continues upwards on the back of the thorax and the neck while middle and the anterior layers are confined to the lumbar region.

Attachments

Posterior layer

Medially, the posterior layer attaches to the tips of the lumbar and sacral spines and the interspinous ligaments. To the sides it blends with the middle layer at the lateral border of the erector spinae muscle group that extends the vertebral column (bending the spine so the head moves back relative to the chest), also known as sacrospinalis in older texts and more recently as extensor spinae,[3] though this term is not in widespread use. Superiorly it continues on to the back of the thorax where it attaches to the vertebral spines and the ribs, inferiorly to the posterior quarter of the outer lip of the Iliac crest.

Middle layer

Medially, the middle layer attaches to the tips of the lumbar transverse processes and the transverse ligaments, laterally, it blends with the anterior layer at the lateral border of the quadratus lumborum, and superiorly it attaches to the lower border of the 12th rib and to the lumbocostal ligament and inferiorly, it attaches to the posterior part of the intermediate area of the Iliac crest.[3]

Anterior layer

Medially, the anterior layer attaches to the vertical ridges on the anterior surface of the lumbar transverse processes, laterally it blends with the middle layer at the lateral border of the quadratus lumborum and superiorly, it forms the lateral arcuate ligament, extending from the tip of  the first lumbar transverse process to the 12th rib and inferiorly, it attaches to the inner lip of the iliac crest and iliolumbar ligament.

References 

Abdomen
Fascia